Freeads.co.uk is an online classifieds website in the UK, and part of Freeads Classifieds Ltd. group and are owned by private investors. Covering over 50 cities across the United Kingdom, Freeads.co.uk was recently voted the 7th in Harris Interactive's  survey in the "Classifieds & consumer to consumer marketplaces" behind the likes of eBay and Amazon.

Background
Freeads is a UK classified ads and community marketplace. It connects buyers and sellers of second hand furniture, homewares, garden goods, vehicles, property, jobs and rehomes pets.

Advertising on Freeads.co.uk is free with paid upgrades available for depending on the product category and the geographical market. Sellers may promote their listing through featured placements.

History
2001 - freeads was founded as an incubator project by seed investors, then trading as Freeads.net

14 May 2002 - company formed and rebranded as Freeads.co.uk

7 Feb 2012 - Appointment of Daniel Newman as a director

21 Nov 2017	Termination of appointment of Daniel Newman as a director

References

External links 
 Freeads.co.uk

Online marketplaces of the United Kingdom